Maire-Ilon Wikland (née Pääbo; born February 5, 1930) is an Estonian-born Swedish artist and illustrator.

Wikland was born in Tartu, Estonia and raised in Haapsalu, Lääne County on Estonia's Baltic coast. In 1944 she escaped with the family of a classmate from the second Soviet occupation of Estonia, to Sweden, where she arrived as a refugee.

In 1953 Wikland applied for a job as illustrator at Rabén & Sjögren. She was met by Astrid Lindgren, who had just finished writing the book Mio, my Son and who could see immediately that Wikland was able to "draw fairytales". Wikland did a test-drawing for the book and after that her collaboration with Lindgren continued. Wikland has said that Lindgren's writing continually makes her see inner pictures. She also derives inspiration for her pictures from real life. In the same way that Lindgren wrote for "the child within her", Wikland often also draws for the child within her.

Wikland is the artist who has illustrated the greatest number of Lindgren's books:
 The Six Bullerby Children (a.k.a. The Children of Noisy Village)
 The Children on Troublemaker Street
 The Brothers Lionheart
 Karlsson-on-the-Roof
 Mardie
 Mio, My Son
 Simon Small Moves In
 Ronia the Robber's Daughter
 Seacrow Island
 The Ghost of Skinny Jack
 The Red Bird.
She has also provided the illustrations for many picture books by Lindgren and many other writers, including The Dragon with Red Eyes, I Want a Brother or Sister, That’s My Baby, Brenda Helps Grandmother, Simon Small Moves in, and The Borrowers.

In 2004 Wikland decided to gift her original illustrations to Estonia. The artwork was originally exhibited in Wikland's gallery in Haapsalu, Estonia. In 2009 "Ilon's Wonderland", a gallery and theme centre for children and families based on her works and illustrations, was opened in Haapsalu.

Awards 
Wikland was awarded the Illis quorum by the government of Sweden in 2002 for her "outstanding ability to bring environments and characters to life from her own and Astrid Lindgren's writings".

References

External links 
 Ilon Wikland at AstridLindgren.se
 Iloni Imedemaa, or Ilons Wonderland, museum in Haapsalu, Estonia
 I Draw, Therefore I Am (2009) – documentary film by Kim Finn and John Hakalax
 
 Soome produtsent ja lavastaja John Hakalax räägib Ilon Wiklandi eluloofilmi saamisloost
 

1930 births
Living people
20th-century Swedish women artists
20th-century Estonian women artists
21st-century Swedish women artists
21st-century Estonian women artists
People from Tartu
Swedish illustrators
Estonian women illustrators
People from Haapsalu
Estonian emigrants to Sweden
Estonian World War II refugees
Swedish fantasy illustrators
Estonian children's book illustrators
Swedish children's book illustrators
Recipients of the Order of the White Star, 3rd Class
Recipients of the Illis quorum